Rachi is a rural locality (a station) in Urilsky Selsoviet of Arkharinsky District, Amur Oblast, Russia. The population was 1 as of 2018. There is 1 street.

Geography 
The village is located on Trans-Siberian Railway, 40 km east from Arkhara and 10 km west from Uril.

References 

Rural localities in Arkharinsky District